In 2017, the NCAA Division I Wrestling Championships, a U.S. college wrestling tournament, was held in St. Louis, Missouri. The winning team was Penn State, and Kyle Snyder won the individual heavyweight competition.

Team results

Championship finals

References

2017 NCAA Tournament Results
2017 NCAA Bracket

NCAA Division I Wrestling Championship
NCAA
Wrestling competitions in the United States
2017 in American sports
2017 in sports in Missouri
Sports competitions in St. Louis